The snow pea is an edible-pod pea with flat pods and thin pod walls. It is eaten whole, with both the seeds and the pod, while still unripened.

Names 
The common name snow pea seems to be a misnomer as the planting season of this pea is no earlier than that of other peas. Another common name Chinese pea is probably related to its prominence in Chinese dishes served in the West. It is often called mangetout ("eat-all") in the British Isles, but this can apply both to snow peas and to snap peas.

Snow peas and snap peas both belong to Macrocarpon Group, a cultivar group based on the variety Pisum sativum var. macrocarpum Ser. named in 1825. It was described as having very compressed non-leathery edible pods in the original publication.

The scientific name Pisum sativum var. saccharatum Ser. is often misused for snow peas. The variety under this name was described as having sub-leathery and compressed-terete pods and the French name petit pois. The description is inconsistent with the appearance of snow peas, and therefore botanists have replaced this name with Pisum sativum var. macrocarpum. Austrian scientist and monk Gregor Mendel used peas which he called Pisum saccharatum in his famous experiments demonstrating the heritable nature of specific traits, and this Latin name might not refer to the same varieties identified with modern snow peas.

As food 

Snow peas, along with sugar snap peas and unlike field and garden peas, are notable for having edible pods that lack inedible fiber (in the form of "parchment", a fibrous layer found in the inner pod rich in lignin) in the pod walls.  Snow peas have the thinner walls of the two edible pod variants.  Two recessive genes known as p and v are responsible for this trait.  p is responsible for reducing the sclerenchymatous membrane on the inner pod wall, while v reduces pod wall thickness (n is a gene that thickens pod walls in snap peas).

The stems and leaves of the immature plant are used as a vegetable in Chinese cooking, stir-fried with garlic and sometimes combined with crab or other shellfish.

As nitrogen fixers 
As with most legumes, snow peas host beneficial bacteria, rhizobia, in their root nodules, which fix nitrogen in the soil—this is called a mutualistic relationship—and are therefore a useful companion plant, especially useful to grow intercropped with green, leafy vegetables that benefit from high nitrogen content in their soil.

Cultivation and storage 
Snow peas can be grown in open fields during cool seasons and can thus be cultivated during winter and spring seasons.

Storage of the pea with films of polymethylpentene at a temperature of 5 °C and a concentration of oxygen and carbon dioxide of 5 kPa augments the shelf life, internal and external characteristics of the plant.

Gallery

See also 

 List of companion plants
 Pea
 Rhizobia
 Snap pea

References 

Fabeae
Edible legumes
Pod vegetables
Nitrogen-fixing crops